Hamoud al-Aqla al-Shu'aybi (also Hamoud al-Oqala al-Shuebi, Humud b. ‘Uqala’ al-Shu‘aybi) (died late 2001) was a  Saudi-born Islamic cleric.

He has been seen as a radical element  since at least 1994 when he was quoted by Osama bin Laden in his Open Letter to Bin Baz on the Invalidity of his Fatwa on Peace with the Jews, and several weeks after the Invasion of Afghanistan.   Al-Shuebi authored a book The Preferred View on the Ruling of Asking the Infidels for Help, that is said (by ) to have been  "seminal in convincing a generation they should stand against—and hate—the encroachments of the West."

He supported the 9/11 attacks and issued a Fatwa praising the Taliban shortly after their destruction of the Buddha sculptures in Bamiyan for creating "the only country in the world in which there are no man-made laws".

The Central Intelligence Agency accused many Guantanamo detainee of obeying his fatwa and used it to torture them without any evidence.

Al-Shuebi School
Some students of al-Oqala al-Shuebi make up what has been called the "al-Shuebi school", based out of the very conservative city of Buraydah, capital of al-Qasim Province in Saudi Arabia. The most important of his students are Nasir al-Fahd, Ali al-Khudair, Hamoud al-Khaldi, and Sulaiman Al-Elwan. As of 2010, the four had been in prison since 2003, following the May 2003 suicide bombings of residential compounds in Riyadh that killed 34 people, and which they reportedly supported.   The school helped to legitimize the jihadi movement's fight against the Saudi state and aided in the recruitment of new supporters when the movement began to emerge in Saudi Arabia in late-1999 and early-2000.

References

2001 deaths
Year of birth missing
Saudi Arabian prisoners and detainees
Saudi Arabian Sunni Muslim scholars of Islam
Saudi Arabian Salafis
Critics of Shia Islam
Saudi Arabian imams
20th-century Muslim scholars of Islam
Academic staff of Imam Muhammad ibn Saud Islamic University